The 2022 McGrath Cup was an inter-county Gaelic football competition in the province of Munster, played by all six county teams.

The opening game, between Clare and Waterford, was postponed, with Waterford unable to field a team due to COVID-19 cases and contacts.

Format
The teams are drawn into two groups of three teams. Each team plays the other teams in its group once, earning 2 points for a win and 1 for a draw. The two group winners play in the final; if the final is a draw, it goes to a penalty shootout without extra time being played.

Fixtures and results

Group A

Group B

Final

References

McGrath Cup
McGrath Cup
McGrath Cup